United Arab Emirates competed at the 2022 World Aquatics Championships in Budapest, Hungary from 17 June to 3 July.

Swimming

United Arab Emirates entered two swimmers.

Men

References

Nations at the 2022 World Aquatics Championships
United Arab Emirates at the World Aquatics Championships
2022 in Emirati sport